Chrysler Financial may refer to:
 FCA's financing organization for the United States, Chrysler Capital
 Chrysler's international financing organization, TD Auto Finance